The 1888 Trinity Blue and White football team represented Trinity College (today known as Duke University) in the 1888 college football season. The game against North Carolina was the first "scientific" game in the state.

Schedule

References

Trinity
Duke Blue Devils football seasons
Trinity Blue and White football